The Fellowship of Evangelical Churches (FEC) is an evangelical body of Christians with an Amish Mennonite heritage that is headquartered in Fort Wayne, Indiana, United States. It contains 60 churches located in Colorado, Idaho, Illinois, Indiana, Kansas, Maine, Michigan, Minnesota, Missouri, Ohio, and Pennsylvania.

History

Beginnings as Egly Amish
In the first half of the 19th century, the time before the Amish split into Amish Mennonites and Old Order Amish, several members of the Amish Egly family immigrated from Baden, Germany, to North America. Among them was Henry Egly (1824–1890). Egly was elected deacon of a Berne-Geneva Amish church in Indiana. In 1858, Egly was then elected bishop of the Berne-Geneva Amish Church. Egly, who insisted on the new birth experience, withdrew from the Amish church. Approximately half of the congregation withdrew as well. In 1866, the first Egly-Amish church was created in Berne, Indiana. In the beginning the Egly Amish church was very strict in regard to discipline and dress, but later developed in the same direction as the Amish Mennonites, that is towards the Mennonite mainstream, away from the Amish heritage.

Defenseless Mennonites
The Egly-Amish officially adopted the name "Defenseless Mennonite" on 6 November 1908 as the congregation wanted to be known as more Mennonite rather than Amish.

Evangelical Mennonite Church
In 1942, the Defenseless Mennonites were charter members in the founding of the National Association of Evangelicals. Later, in 1948, their name was changed to "Evangelical Mennonite Church" to reflect both their Anabaptist and Evangelical beliefs.

Fellowship of Evangelical Churches
On 2 August 2003, the Evangelical Mennonite Church voted to be known as the "Fellowship of Evangelical Churches", or FEC.

Doctrine
The Defenseless Mennonite Conference published its Confession of Faith, Rules and Discipline in 1917. The confession of faith was revised in 1937, 1949, 1961, and 1980. It contains 12 articles of faith. The Lord's Supper is observed with open communion.

Organization
The conference office is located in Fort Wayne, Indiana. The FEC organization is governed through a congregational form of governance. Local congregations elect delegates to a delegate body, which in turn elects the conference leadership. The conference is composed of 34 churches in the Midwest of the United States, with 5278 members. 55 percent of the churches are located in Illinois and Indiana. All FEC ministries are funded by voluntary donations of congregations and individuals.

Branches and connections
 The Missionary Church Association came out of the "Egly Amish" in 1898 (see Missionary Church). 
 The Evangelical Mennonite Church is a member of the National Association of Evangelicals.

Affiliated organizations
These organizations have their own governing boards but are affiliated solely with the Fellowship of Evangelical Churches.
 Miracle Camp and Retreat Center
 Life Change Camp and Retreat Center
 Salem4Youth
 Christian Service Foundation

Affiliated churches

Colorado 
Lifegate Church

Idaho 
Lakeview Bible Church

Illinois
Calvary Community Church
Crossroads Church of Monticello
Dewey Community Church
Eureka Bible Church
Grace Evangelical Church
Great Oaks Community Church
Groveland Evangelical Mennonite Church
Heartland Community Church
Jacob’s Well Community Church
Living Hope Community Church
New Beginnings Church
Northwoods Community Church
Oak Grove Evangelical Bible Church
Salem Church

Indiana 
Berne Evangelical Church
Brookside Church
Crossview Church
Highland Gospel Community
Mission Church
Pine Hills Church
Pine Hills Kendallville
Sonlight Community Church
Upland Community Church
Westwood Fellowship

Kansas 
Grace Community Church
Grace Community Fellowship
Grace Crossing
New Anthem Community Church
Sterling Evangelical Bible Church
King's Cross Church

Maine 
The Hill
Life Community Church
Moss Brook Community Church

Michigan 
Church of the Good Shepherd
Comins Mennonite Church
Lawton Evangelical Church
Neighborhood Church
The Remedy

Minnesota 
The Real Tree Church
True North

Missouri 
Bethel Fellowship Church
Freedom Point
Harrisonville Community Church
PeaRidge Community Church

Ohio 
Archbold Evangelical Church
Catalyst Community Church
Christ the King Church
Crossroads Evangelical Church
Crossroads Church (Napoleon)
Evermore Community Church
Life Church of Loraine County
Life Community Church
Oak Bend Church
Pathway Church
Solid Rock Community Church
Wave Community Church

Pennsylvania 
River City Church

Literature 
Frank S. Mead, Samuel S. Hill, and Craig D. Atwood: Handbook of Denominations in the United States.
Cornelius J. Dyck, Dennis D. Martin, et al., editors: Mennonite Encyclopedia.
Glenmary Research Center: Religious Congregations & Membership in the United States (2000).

References

External links

Evangelical Mennonite Church (United States) at Global Anabaptist Mennonite Encyclopedia Online 
Christian Service Foundation
LifeChange Camp and Retreat Center
Miracle Camp and Retreat Center
Salem4Youth

Mennonite denominations
Evangelical denominations established in the 19th century
Religious organizations established in 1865
Members of the National Association of Evangelicals
Evangelical denominations in North America
1865 establishments in Indiana